Charles Holland may refer to:

Charles Holland (actor) (1733–1769), English actor
Charles Holland (cyclist) (1908–1989), English road bicycle racer
Charles A. Holland (1872–1940), American local politician in Los Angeles
Charles Hepworth Holland (born 1923), British geologist
Charles R. Holland (born 1946), former Commander at United States Special Operations Command
Charles Thurstan Holland (1863–1941), general practitioner in Liverpool